Obermueller is a surname. Notable people with the surname include:

Jerry Obermueller (born 1947), American politician
Karola Obermueller (born 1977), German composer and teacher
Mike Obermueller (born 1973), American lawyer and politician
Wes Obermueller (born 1976), American baseball player